African Arts is a peer-reviewed academic journal devoted to the study and discussion of traditional, contemporary, and popular African arts. It was founded in 1967 and is published online and in hard copy by the MIT Press, which distributes the journal for the James S. Coleman African Studies Center at the University of California, Los Angeles.

External links 
 
 African Arts on UCLA website
 Coleman African Studies Center

Arts journals
African studies journals
Publications established in 1967
English-language journals
Quarterly journals
MIT Press academic journals
1967 establishments in the United States